The School of Journalism and Communication is a department within the Faculty of Public Affairs at Carleton University in Ottawa, Ontario, Canada. It is the oldest four-year journalism program in Canada. The journalism program is recognized as one of North America's most well-respected centres for the study of journalism.

Degrees and Programs 
The School of Journalism and Communication is part of the Faculty of Public Affairs and has a distinct institutional status within the university, on account of its well-established history, higher admission requirements and distinct degree programs.

Undergraduate programs 
The School of Journalism offers a four-year Bachelor of Journalism Honours program. Graduates of the undergraduate program receive an honours Bachelor of Journalism (BJ) degree. 

In 2018, a Bachelor of Media Production and Design degree was added to the program offerings.

Graduate Program 
At the graduate level, the School of Journalism offers a two-year Master's program. Its graduates receive a Master of Journalism (MJ) degree. Applicants with professional journalism experience or degrees in journalism may be admitted directly into Year Two of the program, allowing them to complete the graduate program in one year.

Non-Degree Programs & Initiatives

Apprenticeships Program 
The School of Journalism and Communication offers its students workplace experience through the Apprenticeship Program. Apprenticeships are unpaid work  intended to provide hands-on experience to students outside of the classroom setting.

BJ students with third- and fourth-year standing have an apprenticeship/internship requirement and may use the Apprenticeship Program to meet this requirement. 

MJ students must to complete four months of practical experience to their fulfill degree requirements and may use the Apprenticeships Program to meet program requirements.

Rwanda Initiative 
From 2006 to 2011, the School of Journalism and Communication ran a teaching partnership and student internship exchange program called the Rwanda Initiative. The program sought to address the shortage of journalism educators in Rwanda and improve journalism standards through a teaching exchange between the Carleton University School of Journalism and Communication and the National University of Rwanda in Butare. The project involved curriculum development for the university programs and media-training workshops for working journalists in Rwanda presented by faculty from both universities.

The Initiative also included internship program for senior journalism students from Carleton. The journalism students would travel to Rwanda for two months, where they would intern at local media outlets. The Rwanda Initiative also facilitated travel for Rwandan journalists to study at Carleton or take up internships with Canadian news organizations.

The program was suspended in 2011 due to a lack of funding when a partnership agreement with the U.S. Government lapsed. The annual cost of the program was stated at $240,000 CAD.

The Future of Journalism Initiative 
In 2020, the School of Journalism and Communication launched a research initiative called The Future of Journalism Initiative. The endeavor has designated funding, an emerging reporter bursary and a visiting research fellowship and works in service of "projects that serve a public interest and/or bolster the study of journalism in society."

History 
Founded in 1945, The School of Journalism and Communication celebrated its 75th anniversary in 2020. The first class was held on October 9, 1945 in downtown Ottawa. 

Early classes at the school were taught by Henry Marshall Tory, who was also the president of the Carleton at the time. Tory is credited with personally spearheading the creation of the School of Journalism as a response to demands from returning World War II servicemen. The program began as an extension course and later became a four-year program. 

The school granted the first degrees in journalism on October 23, 1946, all of which were conferred to women. They were also three of the first six degrees granted in the history of the University.

Alumni
The School of Journalism graduated approximately 5,000 alumni. 

The school's notable alumni include Edward Greenspon, former editor-in-chief of The Globe and Mail, Paula Newton, International Affairs correspondent for the CNN, Nahlah Ayed, Middle East correspondent for the CBC, Rosemary Barton, chief political correspondent for the CBC, Arthur Kent, Emmy award–winning war correspondent, Dennis Gruending, former Member of Parliament, Paul Watson, Pulitzer Prize–winning photojournalist, Trina McQueen, founding president of the Discovery Channel, Claudia Mo, former Member of the Legislative Council of Hong Kong, and Warren Kinsella, blogger, Toronto lawyer and political strategist for the Liberal Party of Canada.

Notes

External links
 Carleton University School of Journalism and Communication

Journalism
Journalism schools in Canada